Isaac John Armstrong (June 8, 1895 – September 4, 1983) was an American football player, coach of football, basketball, and track, and college athletics administrator.  He served as the head football coach at the University of Utah from 1925 to 1949, compiling a record of 141–55–15.  
Ike Armstrong was the son of George Henry and Margaret Prudence (Gump) Armstrong.

Under Armstrong, Utah won 13 conference championships, seven in the Rocky Mountain Conference and six in the Mountain States / Skyline Six Conference.  Armstrong's 25-year tenure is the longest of any Utah Utes football head coach and his 141 wins are the second most in program history.  Armstrong also coached Utah's basketball and track teams and served as the school's athletic director.  He attended Drake University, where he played college football as a fullback.  From 1950 to 1963, he served the athletic director at the University  of Minnesota.  Armstrong was inducted into the College Football Hall of Fame as a coach in 1957.  He died at the age of 88 of pneumonia at the Flagship Convalescent Home in Corona Del Mar, California on September 4, 1983.

Head coaching record

Football

References

External links
 
 Basketball coaching record @ Sports-Reference.com

1895 births
1983 deaths
American football fullbacks
Drake Bulldogs football players
Minnesota Golden Gophers athletic directors
Utah Utes athletic directors
Utah Utes football coaches
Utah Utes men's basketball coaches
Utah Utes track and field coaches
College Football Hall of Fame inductees
People from Fort Madison, Iowa
Coaches of American football from Iowa
Players of American football from Iowa
Basketball coaches from Iowa